The Office is an American sitcom television series starring Valerie Harper that aired for five episodes on CBS from March 11 to April 15, 1995, as a mid-season replacement during the 1994–95 television season. The series, billed as an office comedy version of the British series Upstairs, Downstairs, centered on the camaraderie of executives and their secretaries of a busy corporate office at a design-packaging company.

Synopsis
Rita Stone (Valerie Harper) is a divorcée and 19-year veteran of a secretarial pool at the executive office of a package design company in Chicago called Package Inc. She is outspoken and mainly the adhesive that holds things together at the company, seeing that everything gets done on time, mediating disputes and trying to be a good listener to both job-related and personal problems.

While Rita is responsible for the company's inept CEO, Frank (Dakin Matthews), she also manages three other secretaries: Beth (Debra Jo Rupp), a flustered mother of four who works for the company's only female executive, Natalie (Lisa Darr);  Mae (Andrea Abbate), a free-spirited, thrice-divorced former temp who works for the firm's temperamental artist (Gary Dourdan); and Deborah (Kristin Dattilo-Hayward), a naive MBA student who works for a sleazy salesman (Kevin Conroy).

Cast
Valerie Harper as Rita Stone
Dakin Matthews as Frank Gerard
Debra Jo Rupp as Beth Avery
Lisa Darr as Natalie Stanton
Kristin Dattilo-Hayward as Deborah Beaumont
Kevin Conroy as Steve Gilman
Andrea Abbate as Mae D'arcy
Gary Dourdan as Bobby Harold

Episodes

Reception
The Office was the fourth starring vehicle for Harper, following her previous television ventures in the sitcoms Rhoda (1974–78), Valerie (1986–87) and City (1990). However, the series did not catch on with the public and was cancelled after five episodes, with one episode remaining unaired. It was broadcast Saturday nights on CBS at 9:00 p.m. throughout its brief run.

References

External links
 
 
 The Office at Sitcoms Online

1995 American television series debuts
1995 American television series endings
1990s American sitcoms
1990s American workplace comedy television series
CBS original programming
English-language television shows
Television series by Warner Bros. Television Studios
Television shows filmed in Los Angeles
Television shows set in Chicago